Highway 304 is a highway in the Canadian province of Saskatchewan.

References

304